Mattia Masi (born 4 December 1984) is a Sammarinese former footballer who played as a midfielder. He was capped four times by the San Marino national team.

References

Living people
1984 births
Sammarinese footballers
Association football midfielders
San Marino international footballers
A.S.D. Victor San Marino players